The Black Spider is a 1920 British silent mystery film directed by William Humphrey and starring Mary Clare, Bertram Burleigh, and Ronald Colman. It is an adaptation of the 1911 novel of the same name by Carlton Dawe. The film was partly shot on location in Monte Carlo.

Plot
A series of robberies have been committed against wealthy inhabitants of Monaco by a thief known as 'The Black Spider'. A young woman steals her aunt's jewels as a joke, pretending to be the Black Spider, but a detective is soon on her trail.

Cast
Mary Clare as Angela Brentwood 
Lydia Kyasht as Angela Carfour 
Bertram Burleigh as Archie Lowndes 
Sam Livesey as Reggie Cosway 
Robert Corbins as Archie Lowndes 
Ronald Colman as Vicomte de Beaurais 
Betty Hall as Irene Carfour 
Hayden Coffin as Lord Carfour 
Adeline Hayden Coffin as Lady Carfour 
Dorothy Cecil as Marjorie West

Bibliography
Low, Rachael. The History of British Film, Volume 4 1918-1929. Routledge, 1997.

References

External links

British silent feature films
Films directed by William J. Humphrey
1920 mystery films
British mystery films
Films set in Monaco
British black-and-white films
1920s British films
Silent mystery films
1920s English-language films